Simona La Mantia (born 14 April 1983 in Palermo) is an Italian triple jumper. Her best result at international senior level was a gold medal at the 2011 European Indoor Championships.

Biography
La Mantia's parents were both athletes: her mother Monica Mutschlechner was an 800 metres runner while her father Antonino La Mantia participated in the steeplechase.

Her first successes came the European Athletics U23 Championships, where she won silver in the triple jump in 2003, and improved to win the gold medal in 2005.

She represented Italy at the 2004 Summer Olympics and the 2005 World Championships in Athletics. In the 2004 Summer Olympics, she achieved seventh place in the qualification round, failing to secure qualification to the final. The exact same thing happened at the 2005 World Championships. She struggled with injuries over the following years but regained form in May 2010, jumping over 14 metres for the first time in four years. That year she also won a silver medal at the 2010 European Athletics Championships followed by a win in the triple jump at the 2011 European Athletics Indoor Championships.

Since then she has competed at the 2013 World Championships and won the bronze medal at the 2013 European Indoor Championships.

Her personal best jump is 14.69 metres, achieved in May 2005 in her hometown Palermo. In addition she has 6.48 m in the long jump. On 6 October 2012 she married Alessandro Tazzini.

Achievements

National titles
Simona La Mantia has won the individual national championship 12 times.
6 wins in the triple jump (2004, 2005, 2006, 2010, 2011, 2012)
6 wins in the triple jump indoor (2004, 2006, 2011, 2012, 2013, 2014)

See also
Italian all-time lists - Triple jump

References

External links
 

1983 births
Living people
Sportspeople from Palermo
Italian female triple jumpers
Athletes (track and field) at the 2004 Summer Olympics
Athletes (track and field) at the 2012 Summer Olympics
Olympic athletes of Italy
Athletics competitors of Fiamme Gialle
European Athletics Championships medalists
World Athletics Championships athletes for Italy
Athletes (track and field) at the 2013 Mediterranean Games
Mediterranean Games competitors for Italy